Buck Hill is an elevation and ski hill in Burnsville, Minnesota, United States. 

Buck Hill may also refer to:

People
Buck Hill (musician) (1927-2017), American jazz saxophonist

Places
Buck Hill (British Columbia), a hill in Canada
Buck Hill, Wiltshire, a hamlet in Calne Without parish, England
Buck Hill (Herkimer County, New York), an elevation in the United States
Buck Hill (Oneida County, New York), an elevation in the United States

See also
Buck Hill Farm Covered Bridge, bridge in Lancaster County, Pennsylvania, United States
Buck Hill Falls, Pennsylvania, private resort community in the United States
Buckhill Colliery Halt railway station, a former railway station in Cumbria, England